The 2002 IAAF Golden League was the fifth edition of the annual international track and field meeting series, held from 28 June to 6 September. It was contested at seven European meetings: the Bislett Games, Meeting Gaz de France, Golden Gala, Herculis, Weltklasse Zürich, Memorial Van Damme and the Internationales Stadionfest (ISTAF).

The Golden League jackpot consisted of one million US dollars' worth of gold bars. The jackpot was available to athletes who won all seven competitions of the series in one of the twelve specified events (divided equally between the sexes) and participated at the 2002 IAAF Grand Prix Final. The jackpot events for 2002 were: 100 metres for men and women, women's 400 metres, 1500 metres for men and women, 3000 metres/5000 metres for men and women, women's 100 metres hurdles, men's 400 metres hurdles, men's pole vault, men's triple jump and women's javelin throw.

The prize was shared between four athletes who won all seven events: Morocco's Hicham El Guerrouj, Felix Sánchez of the Dominican Republic, American Marion Jones and Mexico's Ana Guevara. Marion Jones's results were later annulled after she admitted to doping. Gail Devers came close to winning the jackpot, taking 100 m hurdles victories at all competitions except for Zurich, where she was beaten by Glory Alozie.

Results

References

Results
Oslo
Paris
Rome
Monaco
Zurich
Brussels
Berlin

External links
IAAF competition website

Golden League
IAAF Golden League